Thomas A. Pope (December 15, 1894 – June 14, 1989) was a soldier in the United States Army who received the Medal of Honor for his actions at the Battle of Hamel, in France during World War I. Pope's unit was attached to an Australian Army battalion during the battle and, following a recommendation from an Australian officer, Pope was also awarded the Distinguished Conduct Medal, by King George V.

Biography
Pope was born in Chicago, Illinois on December 15, 1894. C

He joined the Illinois National Guard at Chicago, before the US entered World War I. During the war, Pope served in Company "E", 131st Infantry Regiment, 33rd Division. By the time of the Battle of Hamel, he held the rank of corporal.

Rank and organization: Corporal, US Army, . Place and date: At Hamel, France, 4 July 1918.  Ill. Birth: Chicago, Ill. G.O. No.: 44, W.D., 1919.
After the war, he was a district foreman for the Cook County Highway Department. He also served as a contact officer for the Veterans Administration. He was married and had three daughters.

He died June 14, 1989. At the time he died, Pope was the only surviving US Army  Medal of Honor recipient from  World War I. He is buried at Arlington National Cemetery.

Medal of Honor

 Citation:His company was advancing behind the tanks when it was halted by hostile machinegun fire. Going forward alone, he rushed a machinegun nest, killed several of the crew with his bayonet, and, standing astride his gun, held off the others until reinforcements arrived and captured them.

See also

 List of Medal of Honor recipients
 List of Medal of Honor recipients for World War I

References

Further reading
 Sanborn, Joseph Brown, and George Nathaniel Malstrom. The 131st U.S. Infantry (First Infantry Illinois National Guard) in the World War; Narrative-Operations-Statistics. Chicago: 1919. 
 Murray, Nicholas. "Thomas Pope." America's Heroes: Medal of Honor Recipients from the Civil War to Iraq, edited by James Willbanks. ABC-CLIO, 2011.

External links
 
 
 

1894 births
1989 deaths
United States Army personnel of World War I
Burials at Arlington National Cemetery
Military personnel from Chicago
Recipients of the Croix de Guerre 1914–1918 (France)
Recipients of the Distinguished Conduct Medal
United States Army Medal of Honor recipients
United States Army soldiers
World War I recipients of the Medal of Honor